ACS Combinatorial Science (usually abbreviated as ACS Comb. Sci.), formerly Journal of Combinatorial Chemistry (1999-2010), was a peer-reviewed scientific journal, published since 1999 by the American Chemical Society. ACS Combinatorial Science publishes articles, reviews, perspectives, accounts and reports in the field of Combinatorial Chemistry. 

Anthony Czarnik served as the founding editor from 1999-2010. M.G. Finn served as Editor from 2010-2020. In 2010, ACS agreed to change the name of the journal to "Combinatorial Science" and it was the first and only ACS journal to be devoted to a way of doing science, rather than to a specific field of knowledge or application.

The journal stopped accepting new submissions in August and the last issue was published in December 2020.

Abstracting and indexing 
JCS is currently indexed in: 

 Chemical Abstracts Service (CAS)
 SCOPUS
 EBSCOhost
 PubMed 
 Web of Science

References

Combinatorial Science
Publications established in 1999
Monthly journals
English-language journals
Combinatorial chemistry
1999 establishments in the United States